Yaşar Erkan (30 April 1911 in Erzincan – 18 May 1986) was a Turkish sports wrestler, who won the first ever Olympic gold medal for Turkey in the Featherweight class of Men's Greco-Roman Wrestling. Yaşar Erkan is the first Olympic champion in Turkish history.

Wrestling career
Son of a wrestler for yağlı güreş (oil wrestling), he moved with his family from their village İspidi in the Refahiye district of Erzincan Province to Istanbul at 4 years of age. He started wrestling at Kumkapı Wrestling Club and grew up here. His father Ali Efendi was also one of the famous wrestlers of their village. Yaşar Erkan was selected to the Turkish National Wrestling Team in 1933 and won the Balkan Championship in the same year. He also held this title in 1934 and 1935. In 1936, he became the first ever Turkish sportsman to win a gold medal at the Olympics. 

"You are small, but you have done an important job for the country. Now your name has gone down in Turkish sports history. Long live Yaşar!". The telegram is from Mustafa Kemal Atatürk. Later, Erkan was presented with a house by Atatürk, and the athlete's surname "Naçar", meaning helpless, was changed by Atatürk to "Erkan", meaning a prominent member of a community. Yaşar Erkan was also a tailor.

Erkan died on May 18, 1986. His grave is in Merkezefendi Cemetery in Zeytinburnu.

References

External links
 

1911 births
1986 deaths
People from Erzincan
Olympic wrestlers of Turkey
Wrestlers at the 1936 Summer Olympics
Turkish male sport wrestlers
Olympic gold medalists for Turkey
Olympic medalists in wrestling
Medalists at the 1936 Summer Olympics
20th-century Turkish people